Abu Zakaria al-Jamal (1959 – 3 January 2009) was a senior Hamas commander.

Abu was the second senior Hamas member to be killed in the 2008–2009 Israel–Gaza conflict after Nizar Rayan. He was killed by Israeli air strikes in Gaza on 3 January 2009. Zakaria al-Jamal was commander of Gaza City's rocket-launching squads, belonging to Hamas' military wing, Izz ad-Din al-Qassam Brigades.

References

1959 births
2009 deaths
Hamas military members
People from Gaza City
Deaths by Israeli airstrikes
Assassinated Palestinian politicians
Assassinated Hamas members